"The Adventure of Henry Baskerville and a Dog" (Basukābiru kun to inu no bōken) is an episode of the NHK puppetry "Sherlock Holmes" that was broadcast on 4 and 11 January 2015 by NHK Educational TV.

Summary
The episode is based on The Hound of the Baskervilles and The Adventure of the Dancing Men and is set in Beeton School, a fictional boarding school. John H. Watson investigates a mysterious dog appears in the school for Holmes is busy with deciphering the stick figures.

In the episode, both Henry Baskerville and Watson sing "The Other Day I Met a Bear" to encourage themselves on the way to the spot where the Monster Dog appears.

Plot
Henry Baskerville of Dealer House visits 221B to requests Holmes to search for the "Monster Dog" he saw near a fossil digging spot in the back of Beeton school. But Holmes refuses because he is busy with deciphering the stick figures put on the wall of school building. Then Watson begins investigating for he has a strong sense of rivalry against him when he hears that Baskerville is going out with Mary Morstan and she was with him when the monster appeared. Baskerville hates a dog since his childhood but is ashamed of leaving Mary behind him. One afternoon Watson goes to the spot with Mary and meets a curious pupil called Jack Stapleton, who is one of the childhood friends of Mary. He has an interest in the fossil includes that of Piltdown Man.

However Watson's investigation doesn't go well and Mary seems to keep something secret. Holmes still devotes himself to decipher the strange message disregarding Agatha Wright who calls herself his assistant. He advises Watson to go to the spot with Sherman for she understands dog's language. Next Sunday, Baskerville goes there with Mary again to clear himself of a disgrace of leaving her alone but he escapes as he did before when the monster appears. Sherman tries to communicate with the monster but it doesn't understand her language. She says "It cannot be a dog."

Holmes starts investigating the Monster Dog and finds something looks like the monster's footprints that are very different from those of a dog. During the search, Stapleton greets Holmes but a strange smell drifts then. The sources of the smell is an unwashed sock of Baskerville put in Mary's bag by someone. Baskerville loses his face and leaves there. On the other hand, Agatha deciphers all the codes though Holmes is about to decipher most of them. Baynes appears there and says that the message using stick figures is his challenges to Holmes whom "he respects". The codes were used by the gangsters in Chicago whom his grandfather concerned himself in and what it means as follows.

"EVEN HOLMES CAN NEVER OVERCOME BAYNES"
 
He tells Holmes that he should have deciphered them and leaves there with loud laughter. He takes it out on Agatha who deciphers them prior to him.
 
Since then Agatha has never visited 221B. Watson worries about it but Holmes precedes unmasking the monster and tells Watson to visit the spot with Mary and there they see the "Monster Banana" who throws bananas at Watson. It is Stapleton who harasses him by disguising himself as banana he dislikes but the appearance of Holmes makes him away. Holmes tells Mary that she knows everything and she tells them that Stapleton always harasses her boyfriends and it is one of the reasons why she doesn't tell the truth to Watson near Stapleton. Mary admires the braveness of Watson for he never leaves her alone, unlike Baskerville. At that moment they hear someone scream.
 
It is the scream of Stapleton who slips on a banana skin and falls into a bottomless swamp. While Holmes spends time by considering the best way to save him, Watson lends him a hand at the risk of his life and it moves him deeply. After that, Watson and Mary toast with milk in 221B but Holmes is not there. He puts such a message on the outside wall of Milverton's room where Agatha is in and invites her out.
 
"AGATHA BE MY ASSISTANT SH"

Cast
Kōichi Yamadera as Sherlock Holmes
Wataru Takagi as John H. Watson
Tomohiko Imai as Henry Baslerville
Anna Ishibashi as Mary Morstan
Sosuke Ikematsu as Jack Stapleton
Kami Hiraiwa as Sherman
Atsuko Takaizumi as Agatha Wright
Daisuke Kishio as Gordon Lestrade

See also
The Adventure of the Cheerful Four

Citations

2015 television episodes
2015 in Japanese television